The Burundi women's national under-20 football team represents Burundi in international youth women's football competitions.

The team finished in 4th place in the first edition of the CECAFA Women's U-20 Championship.

See also 
 Burundi women's national football team

References 

under-20
African women's national under-20 association football teams